The 2017–18 Syrian Premier League season is the 47th since its establishment. This season's league featured one stage. It pitted one group of 14 teams and kicked off on 20 October 2017.
Al-Jaish are the defending champions, having won the previous season championship.

Teams

Stadiums and locations

League table

Standings

Results

Season statistics

Top goalscorers

References 

Syrian Premier League seasons
1
Syria